This is a list of properties and districts in Warren County, Georgia that are listed on the National Register of Historic Places (NRHP).

Current listings

|}

References

Warren
Warren County, Georgia